Nidularium marigoi is a plant species in the genus Nidularium. This species is endemic to Brazil.

References

marigoi
Flora of Brazil